The 1927 The Citadel Bulldogs football team represented The Citadel, The Military College of South Carolina in the 1927 college football season.  Carl Prause served as head coach for the sixth season.  The Bulldogs played as members of the Southern Intercollegiate Athletic Association.  The City of Charleston opened a new stadium for the 1927 season.  The Bulldogs claimed their first win in the stadium over Oglethorpe on October 15, also the day the stadium was dedicated.

Schedule

References

Citadel Bulldogs
The Citadel Bulldogs football seasons
Citadel football